Macromomycin B is an antibiotic with anticancer activity.

References

Antibiotics
Vinylidene compounds